Joan Waste or Wast (1534 – 1 August 1556) was a blind woman who was burned in Derby for refusing to renounce her Protestant faith.

Biography
Waste was born blind in 1534, with her twin brother Roger, to a Derby barber, William Waste and his wife, Joan. By the age of twelve she had learned to knit as well as how to make ropes (her father was also a ropemaker).

In 1553, Queen Mary I came to the throne and in January 1555 it was made illegal by Parliament to hold Protestant views. At least 284 people were condemned for heresy during Mary's reign. Some were famous, the bishops Thomas Cranmer, Hugh Latimer, and Nicholas Ridley among them, but many executed between spring 1555 and the queen's death in November 1558 were from "the lower orders".

Waste was called before the Catholic Bishop of Lichfield and Coventry, Ralph Baines' chancellor, Anthony Draycot, to defend her views; and for these she was condemned. She had objected to the services now being read in Latin. She was sentenced for buying a New Testament which she asked friends to read to her for a penny a time. She also denied the doctrine of transubstantiation and held that the bread and wine were only that.
 Her trial took place at what was then All Saints Parish Church. This building has been rebuilt, but the tower dates from 1530 and the building is now known as Derby Cathedral.

On the day of her death she was reported to have held hands with her twin brother as she walked to her death.

Waste was accompanied to church by Anthony Draycot who gave a final sermon, Thomas Powthread, Sir John Port, Henry Vernon and Master John Dethick of Newhall.

The public execution took place at Windmill Pit on the Burton Road in Derby. Windmill Hill Pit is on Lime Avenue which is just off Burton Road in Derby. She was hanged over the fire with a rope and she fell into the fire when the rope burned through. Waste was expected to suffer for her beliefs for eternity. Draycot it is said went home to his meal that day.

There is a memorial to her in Birchover church. The place where Waste was executed is now the site of a Roman Catholic church. Ralph Baines, the Bishop of Coventry and Lichfield was deprived of his bishopric (21 June 1559) on the accession of Elizabeth I of England and committed to the imprisonment of Edmund Grindal, the Protestant Bishop of London. Draycot was sent to be a prisoner of the Fleet and died after being released in 1571.

A blue plaque commemorating the site of Waste's execution was erected in Lime Avenue by Derby Civic Society in February 2017.

References

Further reading
 The Book of Martyrs, Chapter XV1, Wikisource, accessed February 2009
 Blind Faith - Joan Waste, Derby's Martyr, Pat Cunningham, 
 Poem: 'The Trial And Burning Of Joan Waste' by the Derby Poet Martin Ward, on the free website PoemHunter.com

People from Derby
1534 births
1556 deaths
People executed under Mary I of England
People executed for heresy
Executed British people
Executed English women
English blind people
16th-century Protestant martyrs
16th-century English women
People executed by the Kingdom of England by burning
Executed people from Derbyshire
Protestant martyrs of England